Kim Hack-Yong is a Korean politician who is a member of the National Assembly of South Korea.

References 
He was elected in 2012.
He had served on the National Defense Committee..
In June 2019, he led a delegation to Vietnam to talk about businesses.
In 2020, he was defeated for re-election. In March 2022, he was re-elected in a by-election with 54 percent of the vote.

References 

Living people
1961 births
Members of the National Assembly (South Korea)